Naranga is a genus of moths of the family Noctuidae.

Description
Palpi with second joint reaching above vertex of head and smoothly scaled, and third joint minute. Antennae somewhat thickened, annulate and minutely ciliated in male. Thorax and abdomen tuftless. Forewings with stalked 7, 8, 9 veins. Hindwings with veins 3 and 4 from cell or on a short stalk.

Species
Naranga aenescens Moore, 1881
Naranga brunnea Hampson, 1910
Naranga diffusa Walker, 1865

References

Eustrotiinae
Moth genera